
Cordial is a restaurant in Oss, Netherlands. It is a fine dining restaurant that was awarded one Michelin star for the period 2002–2018.

GaultMillau awarded the restaurant 17 out of 20 points.

Since 2008, head chef of Cordial is Joost Verhoeven. His predecessor was Roger Rassin, who earned the star in 2002.

Cordial is a member of Alliance Gastronomique Néerlandaise since 2009. The restaurant belongs to Hotel De Weverij.

See also
List of Michelin starred restaurants in the Netherlands

References 

Restaurants in the Netherlands
Michelin Guide starred restaurants in the Netherlands
Restaurants in North Brabant
Oss